is a side-scrolling platform game published by Hudson Soft that was originally released for the Nintendo Entertainment System in 1992. It is the third game in the Adventure Island released for the NES, following Adventure Island II. Unlike the first two games in the series, the NES version was never released in Europe. A portable version was also released for the Game Boy in 1993 titled Takahashi Meijin no Bouken Jima III, renamed to Adventure Island II: Aliens in Paradise outside of Japan.

Gameplay

Higgins can crouch, an ability he did not have in the previous NES games, but he loses the ability to backtrack during a stage. Unlike the previous game, the boss does not move to a different stage when the player loses a life.

The inventory system from the second NES game is still present, but this time he has eight items to choose from instead of just five. Higgins has a fifth dinosaur friend who can help him out: a triceratops (summoned by a star card) that can defeat enemies with his rolling attack. The other new items include a boomerang weapon that can be used as an alternative from Higgins' traditional stone axe weapon, and a crystal that provides Higgins with one hitpoint when he begins a stage.

There are different hidden rooms as well, such as a treasure room where Higgins can choose a new power-up, a surfing bonus round, a room containing a crystal (with an option to continue the level or skip it), and a room with the option of skipping a boss (which will also skip the stage) or not.

Version differences
The Game Boy version features a password system, as well as an interactive overall map that allows the player to revisit previously completed stages to find new paths.

Reception

From contemporary reviews, Nintendo Power reviewers George and Rob stated that game was very similar to the previous Adventure Island games, with George mentioning it became "very challenging in advanced stages" and Rob stating "I like the game, but it's not breaking any new ground."

Allgame gave a review score of 3.5 out of 5 stars, stating "not much else has changed in this second sequel" noting only the addition of a new dinosaur partner and that "The graphics, sounds and gameplay are on par with Adventure Island II."

References

External links

1992 video games
Nintendo Entertainment System games
Game Boy games
Adventure Island (franchise)
Platform games
Video games developed in Japan
Video games scored by Hirohiko Takayama
Video games set on fictional islands
Single-player video games
Side-scrolling video games
Now Production games
Hudson Soft games